Kamennaya Polyana is a rural locality (a village) in Novonadezhdinsky Selsoviet, Blagoveshchensky District, Bashkortostan, Russia. The population was 25 as of 2010. There is 1 street.

Geography 
Kamennaya Polyana is located 15 km northeast of Blagoveshchensk (the district's administrative centre) by road. Sedovka is the nearest rural locality.

References 

Rural localities in Blagoveshchensky District